Stephen Ellis is a British documentary film editor and producer. Best known for his work as an editor Fire in the Night, Syria: Children on the Frontline, The Tower: A Tale of Two Cities, Ronaldo and for producing Watani: My Homeland that earned him Academy Award for Best Documentary (Short Subject) nomination at 89th Academy Awards, with director Marcel Mettelsiefen.

Awards and nominations
 Nominated: Academy Award for Best Documentary (Short Subject) - Watani: My Homeland

References

External links
 
 

Living people
British documentary film producers
British film editors
Year of birth missing (living people)